John J. Cotton (October 25, 1924 – September 26, 2016) was an American professional basketball small forward who played one season in the National Basketball Association (NBA) with the Denver Nuggets during the 1949–50 NBA season. He attended the University of Wyoming.

References

External links

1924 births
2016 deaths
Adams State Grizzlies men's basketball coaches
American men's basketball players
Basketball coaches from Montana
Basketball players from Montana
Denver Nuggets (1948–1950) players
Omaha Mavericks men's basketball coaches
Southwestern Moundbuilders men's basketball coaches
Wyoming Cowboys basketball players
Centers (basketball)
Power forwards (basketball)